Jalal Hassan Hachem (born 18 May 1991, in Al Diwaniyah) is an Iraqi football goalkeeper playing for Al-Zawraa in Iraq and the Iraqi football team.

Honors

Club
Al-Zawraa
Iraqi Premier League: 2017–18
Iraq FA Cup: 2018–19
Iraqi Super Cup: 2017

International
Iraq
 Arabian Gulf Cup: 2023

Individual
Soccer Iraq Player of the Year: 2022

References
 Players Profile on Goalzz.com

1991 births
Living people
Iraqi footballers
Sportspeople from Baghdad
Footballers at the 2014 Asian Games
2015 AFC Asian Cup players
2019 AFC Asian Cup players
Association football goalkeepers
Naft Al-Wasat SC players
Iraq international footballers
Asian Games medalists in football
Al-Shorta SC players
Asian Games bronze medalists for Iraq
Medalists at the 2014 Asian Games